WWE Tagged Classics was a series of two-disc DVD sets produced by Silver Vision and World Wrestling Entertainment for retail markets in Region 2 in PAL format. The majority of sets in the series feature a WWF/E pay-per-view event from one year on one disc, "tagged" with another disc that featured the same event from the following year, or two consecutive pay-per-views. The first Tagged Classics DVD set released was WrestleMania 1 and 2 in 2004 and the last to be released was UK Fan Favourites 1993 & 1995 in 2012.

General information
The sets are composed of two WWF/E events each, which were previously released on VHS. They contained no extras beyond the events (unless an extra was included in the original VHS release of the event, i.e. the original WrestleMania XIV DVD release includes a post-match press conference with Stone Cold Steve Austin and Mike Tyson) up until the release of King of the Ring 1999 & 2000, in which the King of the Ring 2000 disc contained the same extras that the original VHS release did.

Most of the sets in the series are simply re-releases of commercial WWF video tapes; however, they are taken from master WWE source tapes of these releases. The same edits on the ex-WWF tapes (as different from the live broadcast PPV version of the event) are present on these sets. The series includes events such as Royal Rumble, WrestleMania, King of the Ring, SummerSlam and Survivor Series, as well as In Your House pay-per-views that began in 1995. There have also been releases of other shows such as One Night Only and UK Rampage 1991 as well as other original VHS titles.

A limited amount of Tagged Classics were released in the United States, spanning the years 2003-2005 and in Canada; 2002-2005, these sets were not produced by Silver Vision.

The future of the Tagged Classics series is uncertain due to Silver Vision and WWE parting ways at the end of 2012. As of 2013, the current licensee, Fremantle, have said they will consider producing similar programming. However, nothing has come of this since.

Exemption from WWF logo and initials censorship

The sets released prior to 2012 were unique as they were, for the most part, free from the former well-documented legal restraints imposed by the federal lawsuits initiated by the World Wildlife Fund in 2002 that prohibited the referencing and use of the scratch logo and initials "WWF", with only the cover art and menu screens of the Tagged Classics displaying the initials "WWE". They served as a more faithful representation of archived WWF material than the more recent Royal Rumble, WrestleMania, SummerSlam and Survivor Series anthologies that were released using the WWE logo before 2012.

They also do not feature the WWE watermark and digital on-screen graphics like more recent WWE Home Video releases do. They do however contain the watermark and digital on-screen graphics for the specific time frame. For instance, there is no watermark used up to 1994, past that; the Golden Era logo is used, then the New Generation Era logo from 1995 onward, and finally the scratch logo for all the Attitude Era discs.

Some theme music is dubbed over on WWE Home Video releases, but not on these Tagged Classics sets. For instance, on the WrestleMania: The Complete Anthology box set — Demolition's entrance theme is dubbed over with generic production music. This is done to save money on paying royalties to certain artists and music production companies. These sets have all the original music included unless they were dubbed over in the original VHS/DVD releases, for example, Unforgiven 1999's main event video package featured music by Fear Factory and System of a Down, but it was dubbed over on the VHS release and thus is also dubbed over on the corresponding Tagged Classics release.

It is not known exactly why these sets are exempt from blurring and editing, but many theories have arisen. The first is that they are direct re-releases from the past. The second is that they are only available in the United Kingdom and Europe, and therefore are exempt from legal restraints because of this. The third reason is that Silver Vision is a third party licensee of WWE Home Video in the United Kingdom, and technically this is not WWE releasing these sets. Also, the court order required the company to remove both auditory and visual references of "WWF" in its library of video footage outside the United Kingdom. Silver Vision are legally allowed to release these events with the various iterations of the WWF logo intact, and references of "WWF" are also allowed to remain.

In July 2012, WWE came to a new agreement with the World Wildlife Fund that allows for WWE to abstain from editing WWF logos and censoring the WWF initials when spoken in archival footage. In exchange, WWE is unable to use any WWF logos for retro-themed programming outside the United Kingdom. The company now uses the WWF block logo, but modified, without the "F".

Prior to losing the production and distribution licenses for WWE Home Video, Silver Vision released the WWF Attitude Collection box set in 2002, as with the Tagged Classics series, this set was also a direct VHS-to-DVD re-release with no editing.

List of WWE Tagged Classics
Below is the complete list of all 84 WWE Tagged Classics released by Silver Vision between 2004 and 2012. The sets are ordered by their release date:

WrestleMania 1 and 2
Royal Rumble 1989 & 1990
WrestleMania 3 and 4
King of the Ring '93 and '94
SummerSlam 1988 and 1989
Royal Rumble 1991 and 1992
Battle Royal at The Albert HallUK Rampage '91
Survivor Series 1987 and 1988
In Your House 1 and 2
Fab FourOne Night Only
In Your House 13 and 16
WrestleMania 5 and 6
King of the Ring '95 and '96
Royal Rumble 1993 and 1994
Survivor Series 1989 and 1990
WrestleMania VII and VIII
SummerSlam 1990 and 1991
SummerSlam 1992 and 1993
Survivor Series 1991 and 1992
WrestleMania IX and X
Royal Rumble 1995 and 1996
King of the Ring 1997 and 1998
SummerSlam 1994 and 1995
WrestleMania XI and XII
Survivor Series 1993 and 1994
SummerSlam 1996 and 1997
Survivor Series 1995 and 1996
Royal Rumble 1997 and 1998
In Your House 3 and 4
WrestleMania 13 and XIV
In Your House 5 and 6
King of the Ring 1999 & 2000
In Your House 7 & 8
SummerSlam 1998 & 1999
In Your House 9 & 10
In Your House 14 & 15
In Your House 11 & 12
Survivor Series 1997 & 1998
Royal Rumble 1999 & 2000
In Your House 17 & 18
In Your House 19 & 20
In Your House 21 & 22
In Your House 23 & 24
In Your House 25 & 26
In Your House 27 & 28
Fully Loaded 1999 & Unforgiven 1999
No Mercy 1999 & Armageddon 1999
WrestleMania 2000
Survivor Series 1999 & Survivor Series 2000
No Way Out 2000 & Backlash 2000
Judgment Day 2000 & Fully Loaded 2000
Royal Rumble 2001 & Royal Rumble 2002
SummerSlam 2000 & SummerSlam 2001
Unforgiven 2000 & No Mercy 2000
Armageddon 2000 & No Way Out 2001
WrestleMania X-Seven
Backlash 2001 & Judgment Day 2001
King of the Ring 2001 & Invasion 2001
Unforgiven 2001 & No Mercy 2001
Survivor Series 2001 & Vengeance 2001
No Way Out 2002 & Backlash 2002
WrestleMania 15 & Hell Yeah
WrestleMania X8
Capital Carnage 1998 & No Mercy 1999
nWo Back in Black & Big Daddy Cool Diesel & Oozing Machismo Razor Ramon
Best of Raw Vol. 1 & 2
Rebellion 2000 & Insurrextion 2001
WrestleFest 1988 & WrestleFest 1990
Rebellion 1999 & Insurrextion 2000
Rebellion 2001 & Insurrextion 2002
The Year in Review 1993 & 1994
The Year in Review: 1995 & 1996
Shawn Michaels Hits from The Heartbreak Kid & Shawn Michaels Heartbreak Express Tour
U.S. Rampage '91 & '92
The Rock The People's Champ & The Rock Just Bring It
Triple H: The Game & That Damn Good
UK Rampage '92 & '93
Undertaker: This is my Yard & Mick Foley: Hard Knocks & Cheap Pops
Brawl in the Family & Wrestling Grudge Matches
Hardy Boyz: Leap of Faith & Lita: It Just Feels Right
Action! & Hardcore

Best of Raw: Volumes 1 & 2 
UK Fan Favourites 1993 & 1995

References

External links

WWE Home Video
Direct-to-video professional wrestling films